David Gonçalves Viana (born 22 January 1992) is a French-Portuguese footballer who plays as a midfielder for FC Mulhouse.

Club career

Early career
Born in Strasbourg, France, Viana was part of RC Strasbourg B, the reserve team of RC Strasbourg Alsace. After Strasbourg was relegated from Ligue 1, Viana transferred to Atlético Madrid and was part of their C squad for a year, making 20 appearances.

Real Salt Lake
Despite being offered a contract extension by Atlético, Viana signed for Major League Soccer side Real Salt Lake on a free transfer on 18 September 2012 following a week-long trial and a MLS Reserve League appearance against Sporting Kansas City. Speaking on signing for RSL, Viana said, "I'm very excited... It's a great opportunity and I feel really good about getting to work with these coaches and players". He made his league debut for RSL on 17 October 2012 as a substitute for Luis Gil in an eventual 0–0 draw against Seattle Sounders FC.

On 11 July 2013, after two appearances, Viana was waived by Real Salt Lake.

Luton Town
Viana moved to English Conference Premier club Luton Town on 30 September 2013 following a successful trial period, during which he scored two goals in two matches. He signed a contract with the club until the end of the 2013–14 season. He made his debut in a 0–0 draw with Staines Town in the FA Trophy on 30 November 2013. He played in two further FA Trophy games, but did not make an appearance in the league as Luton won promotion to League Two with a club-record 101 points. On 9 May 2014, it was announced that Viana would not be offered a new contract and would leave Luton in June 2014.

Olhanense
On 24 January 2015, it was announced that Viana had signed for SC Olhanense of the Portuguese Segunda Liga.

ASCB
On 24 January 2016, it was announced that Viana had signed for ASC Biesheim of the French CFA2.

Mulhouse
Viana moved to FC Mulhouse in summer 2021.

International career
Viana holds both a Portuguese and French passport and has represented Portugal at Under-17, Under-18, and Under-19 levels.

References

External links
 
 

1992 births
Living people
Association football midfielders
Portuguese footballers
Portugal youth international footballers
Atlético Madrid C players
Real Salt Lake players
Luton Town F.C. players
S.C. Olhanense players
ASC Biesheim players
FC Mulhouse players
Major League Soccer players
National League (English football) players
Liga Portugal 2 players
Championnat National 3 players
Portuguese expatriate footballers
Portuguese expatriate sportspeople in the United States
Expatriate soccer players in the United States
Portuguese expatriate sportspeople in England
Expatriate footballers in England